Horse Lakes 152B is an Indian reserve of the Horse Lake First Nation in Alberta.

Geography 
The locality of Horse Lake is on the Horse Lakes 152B reserve.

Demographics 
In the 2011 Canadian Census Horse Lakes 152B has a population of 402 with 111 private dwellings. It is a 20.0% increase from the 2006 Canadian Census with a population of 335.

References 

Indian reserves in Alberta